Federal Government Girls College, Omu-Aran is a federal owned secondary school located in Omu-Aran, Kwara State. The school was founded on 13 May 1995 with 116 pioneer students and Mrs Hajia J. F. Gold as her first principal. The slogan and vision of the school are "together everybody achieves more" and "qualitative girl child education for national development" respectively.

References

External links 
 , the school's official website
 , list of Unity schools

1995 establishments in Nigeria
Boarding schools in Nigeria
Secondary schools in Kwara State
Girls' schools in Nigeria
Educational institutions established in 1995